Dar Ab or Dar-e Ab or Derab may refer to:
 Derab, East Azerbaijan
 Dar Ab, Javar, Kerman Province
 Dar Ab, Sistan and Baluchestan

See also
 Ab Dar (disambiguation)